William Congreve Russell (15 April 1778 – 1850) was a Whig politician in England.

Russell was the son of Thomas Russell, of Moor Green, Moseley, Worcestershire (now Birmingham), by his second wife, Mary Garner. He was commissioned a captain when the North Worcestershire Volunteers were formed in September 1803. On 19 July 1820, he married Elizabeth Mary Hopper (d. 27 June 1821), by whom he had one daughter:
 Elizabeth Mary Russell, married in 1839 to Joseph Bailey

He was elected at the 1832 general election as one of the two Members of Parliament (MP) for East Worcestershire, and held the seat until he stood down at the 1835 general election.

He was also High Sheriff of Worcestershire in 1839. Kings Heath Park was made for him.

References

External links 
 

1778 births
1850 deaths
Deputy Lieutenants of Worcestershire
High Sheriffs of Worcestershire
Members of the Parliament of the United Kingdom for English constituencies
UK MPs 1832–1835
Whig (British political party) MPs